Sree Narayana Guru College, Chelannur is one of the institutions of higher learning run by SN Trusts, Kollam. The college is situated at the foot of the Kalari Hills, about 14 kilometers northeast of Kozhikode (Calicut).

The foundation stone of the college was laid in February 1968 by the late Dr. T. Balakrishnan. The college was founded in the name of Sree Narayana Guru. 
Classes began in June 1968. In 1975 the college was elevated on the status of a degree college with undergraduate courses in botany and commerce. It became a venue for post-graduate studies with the commencement of MCom in 1995 and MA English in 1999. In March 2007 the college was accredited by the NAAC at the level of B+ grade. The college, affiliated to University of Calicut, imparts instruction to nearly one thousand students in different branches of arts, science and commerce at the undergraduate and post-graduate level.

External links

Colleges affiliated with the University of Calicut